Curran is a town in Jackson County, Wisconsin, United States. The population was 343 at the 2010 census.

History
On November 14, 1889, the town of Curran was created out of a portion of the town of Hixton.  It is named for four brothers of the Curran family who owned land in the township.

Geography
 
According to the United States Census Bureau, the town has a total area of 36.2 square miles (93.8 km2), all of it land.   It is bordered on the north by the town of Northfield, on the east by the town of Hixton, on the south by Springfield, and on the west by Trempealeau County (primarily the town of Pigeon in that county, and a small portion of Preston to the southwest).

Demographics

As of the census of 2000, there were 366 people, 127 households, and 102 families residing in the town. The population density was 10.1 people per square mile (3.9/km2). There were 171 housing units at an average density of 4.7 per square mile (1.8/km2). The racial makeup of the town was 97.81% White and 2.19% Native American. Hispanic or Latino of any race were 1.37% of the population.

There were 127 households, out of which 38.6% had children under the age of 18 living with them, 73.2% were married couples living together, 3.9% had a female householder with no husband present, and 18.9% were non-families. 15.7% of all households were made up of individuals, and 7.1% had someone living alone who was 65 years of age or older. The average household size was 2.88 and the average family size was 3.19.

In the town, the population was spread out, with 30.9% under the age of 18, 6.0% from 18 to 24, 31.4% from 25 to 44, 19.4% from 45 to 64, and 12.3% who were 65 years of age or older. The median age was 36 years. For every 100 females, there were 119.2 males. For every 100 females age 18 and over, there were 114.4 males.

The median income for a household in the town was $41,750, and the median income for a family was $47,500. Males had a median income of $30,313 versus $19,063 for females. The per capita income for the town was $16,119. About 7.0% of families and 8.9% of the population were below the poverty line, including 4.8% of those under age 18 and 5.9% of those age 65 or over.

References

Towns in Jackson County, Wisconsin
Towns in Wisconsin